Cuba women's national softball team represents Cuba in international softball competitions.

The team competed at the 1990 ISF Women's World Championship in Normal, Illinois where they finished with 5 wins and 4 losses. The team competed at the 1994 ISF Women's World Championship in St. John's, Newfoundland where they finished tenth. The team competed at the 2010 ISF Women's World Championship in Caracas, Venezuela where they finished ninth.

See also

Cuba men's national softball team

References

External links 
 International Softball Federation

Softball
Women's national softball teams
Softball in Cuba